Sarangpur is a village in Bhabua block of Kaimur district, Bihar, India. As of 2011, its population was 1,641, in 269 households.

References 

Villages in Kaimur district